The 2022 NWSL Expansion Draft (formerly named the 2021 NWSL Expansion Draft) was an expansion draft held by the National Women's Soccer League (NWSL) on December 16, 2021, for two expansion teams, Angel City FC and San Diego Wave FC, to select players from existing teams in the league. Kansas City Current were exempt from the draft.

Format
Each of the NWSL's current teams (with the exception of Kansas City Current, who were exempt from the draft) was allowed to protect nine players, including a maximum of one United States federation player. Angel City FC and San Diego Wave FC were allowed to select one player from each team, for a total of nine players each. Per result of a coin flip, Angel City FC picked first.

Each of the NWSL's existing teams could lose no more than one United States federation player and no more than one player from each position group in total. Angel City FC and San Diego Wave FC could select no more than one United States federation player in total.

Draft results
 Blue highlights indicate United States federation players
 Italics indicate players who are not under contract but whose NWSL playing rights remain with the team

Protected lists by team
Besides Kansas City Current, who were already exempt from the draft per their expansion team agreement, the following teams traded for protections prior to December 10, 2021:
On August 23, 2021, Racing Louisville FC traded for roster protection from Angel City FC.
On December 1, Washington Spirit also traded for roster protection from San Diego Wave FC.
On December 2, Chicago Red Stars traded for roster protection from both Angel City FC and San Diego Wave FC.
On December 4, NJ/NY Gotham FC traded for roster protection also from San Diego Wave FC.
On December 6, Washington Spirit traded for federation player protection while OL Reign also traded for a partial protection from Angel City FC.
On December 8, NJ/NY Gotham FC and Portland Thorns FC both traded for roster protection from Angel City FC, while North Carolina Courage also traded for roster protection from both Angel City FC and San Diego Wave FC.

On December 10, 2021, the NWSL released the protected lists from teams participating in the draft.

 Bold indicates players selected in the Expansion Draft
 Blue highlights indicate United States federation players 
 Italics indicate players who are not under contract but whose NWSL playing rights remain with the team

Houston Dash

OL Reign

Orlando Pride

Portland Thorns FC

Racing Louisville FC

Washington Spirit

See also
List of NWSL drafts
2022 National Women's Soccer League season
2022 NWSL Draft

References

National Women's Soccer League drafts
2022 National Women's Soccer League season
Angel City FC
San Diego Wave FC
NWSL Expansion Draft